A Commons Club is a type of social organization whose membership is "open" rather than selective based on personal introduction and invitation. It may also refer to the lodge or other meeting facility associated with such a club and used for its activities. Usually, Commons Club refers to a type of men's social organization which flourished at institutions of higher education in North America in the late 19th and early 20th centuries.

Principles
Commons Clubs both emulated and differentiated themselves from fraternities and other competing social institutions. They provided a social network, but membership was usually open to anyone interested in joining. The resources of a large organization could be put to sponsoring events and activities, as well as providing dining and housing, beyond the means of an individual student. Commons Clubs over time came to identify their chief ideals as Democracy, Service, and Brotherhood.

History
Greek-letter literary and philosophical societies, starting with Phi Beta Kappa (est. 1779), rose at American universities as an outlet for students frustrated with the traditional curriculum centered on the classics. Some early organizations to use the phrase "commons club" were of this type, their name referring to the democracy and debates of the British House of Commons. In the mid-19th century, general or "social" fraternities supplanted the literary fraternities, to the point where "independent" students became disadvantaged in campus awards and activities as opposed to "Greeks" and considered to occupy a lower position in the social hierarchy of the time.

Four Commons Clubs federated in 1906, with clubs at Wesleyan University, Dartmouth College, Middlebury College, and Norwich University, and began the equivalent of a national organization that any of the college fraternities would have, and from this initial point, the federated organization began to grow.

The Wesleyan Commons Club was the oldest, founded in 1899. Wesleyan President Bradford Paul Raymond met with a group of non-fraternity students, to discuss the possibility of all non-fraternity students rooming and boarding together in a Wesleyan-owned building. Together, they would constitute a 'college commons'. This new organization was announced in the official Wesleyan University Bulletin of June 1899 : "Two conferences have been held recently by President Raymond with students interested in the formation of a commons, under the direction of College authorities. At each meeting the details of the proposed scheme were discussed at some length, and at the close of the second session the President announced that he had received pledges of membership from a sufficient number of men now in college to justify him in proceeding with the arrangement for establishing the commons next year."

The next academic year, still in 1899, sixteen non-fraternity men, led by Frederick Clark, Thomas Travis, and Herbert Ward, formally established the Wesleyan Commons Club. The University also organized the Commons Club as a boarding club, beginning with thirty-eight members, setting the price of board at $2.25 a week.  The next fall, the membership increased to seventy and the college enlarged the building in which they were dining to provide meeting rooms for the group.  Because of the financial aid provided, the University felt free to make a condition that all undergraduate members of the college, not belonging to fraternities, should be offered an election to the group regardless of race, color or creed.

National Federation of Commons Clubs
The success of the Wesleyan Commons Club inspired the founding of similar organizations at Dartmouth College, Middlebury College, and Norwich University. These four formed the National Federation of Commons Clubs in 1906, which would add thirteen additional members by 1918 as well as numerous non-aligned Commons Clubs on campuses throughout the United States and Canada.  Along with the increase in chapter memberships, went a great many improvements, following the easiest course in imitation of the older Greek-letter societies which were close at hand in every college, rather than in sticking to original principles or in making novel but difficult improvements.  The Commons Clubs adopted, one after the other, most of the characteristics of the Greek-letter fraternities, not, however, without a fight at every adoption by the sterner, more democratic element in every chapter.  The innovations consisted of yearly conventions, an annual magazine, initiation and installation rituals, robes, secret hand grips, badges, pennants, private fraternity houses, alumni organizations, and the like.

Because membership was open, a Commons Club could grow to a size unwieldy to govern, inadequate for forming close friendships, and unsuited to the effective advancement of their stated ideals. Factions and in some cases whole clubs split away and sought petitions from national fraternities or declared themselves a local fraternity. In 1905, ten members of the Middlebury Commons Club, including President George E. Kimball, left to form a new organization which later became the Kappa Delta Rho national fraternity. The weak organization of the Federation itself left it vulnerable to splits along competing visions. The never-solved problems of the national order included that of financial support of an adequate system of national control and chapter assistance, without so raising the cost of membership as to defeat the democratic principles of the order; and that of maintaining an efficient and progressive national administration, while still fostering freedom of action of chapters and of individual members.  Most of the national officials, by terms of the constitution, were unpaid undergraduates with little power and with scant financial allotment.  National control was entirely lacking.  Local autonomy allowed the chapters to develop without any spirit of national unity.

As the principles of the order became crystallized and some attempts were made to secure closer national control and similarity among the chapters, the old fight between the democratic and the progressive elements broke out in a more organized way.  That is, the progressive elements in a number of chapters lined up against the democratic factions of other chapters and brought their arguments into the columns of the Chronicle and to the convention floor in 1916, 1917, and 1918.

An attempt was made by the national officers to postpone the 1918 annual convention in an effort to consolidate the interior position of the order, but the storm which had been hovering for years was far too advanced to stem.  Ironically, the Wesleyan Commons Club hastened the storm by proposing in a 1917 round robin letter that the order use a Greek-letter name "Phi Mu Delta."  The "progressives" insisted upon meeting and settling the question.  Only a small representation attended the convention, delegates from seven of the remaining thirteen chapters.  The progressives controlled the delegates of four chapters, the democrats of three.  A compromise was tried but found unacceptable to either side.  The progressives insisted upon a Greek-letter name and exclusive membership policies and the democrats leaned over backwards on the fundamental democratic principles of the order and insisted that the original wide open membership plan be strictly enforced and the old name retained.

The 1918 convention split into two separate meetings, Union College, University of Connecticut, University of Vermont, and University of New Hampshire delegates retiring.  Clarence Dexter Pierce, a member of the University of Vermont Commons Club, successfully sponsored a resolution to declare the Federation a Greek-letter fraternity, with its attendant structure and selectivity. The Commons Clubs at the University of Vermont, University of New Hampshire, and University of Connecticut ratified the plan, forming what is now the Phi Mu Delta national fraternity. While the Union College Commons Club intended to join its counterparts in organizing Phi Mu Delta, the group instead elected to refound the Alpha Charge of Theta Delta Chi in 1923 because of pressure from its alumni.

Those from Wesleyan, Tufts, and Massachusetts, remaining, revised the Commons Club constitution, providing for compulsory adherence to the wide open membership policies of the original Wesleyan Commons Club. The revised Commons Clubs secured the ratification of their more strict democratic constitution by the Hobart chapter and by the nominally-existing but really war-casualty St. Lawrence chapter, and with the three convention stand-patters: Wesleyan, Tufts, and Massachusetts; carried on as the National Federation of Commons Clubs.  By 1928 all the remaining chapters had withdrawn from the Federation and it died.

American Association of Commons Clubs
While the National Federation of Commons Clubs, as such, passed into limbo because of the indifference of the members following World War I, the Commons Club movement is still present on many campuses of the United States.  Due to the zealous extension activities of the Federation's members up to 1917, the Commons Club idea was spread widely.

The most important transplanting of this seed was in the formation of the American Association of Commons Clubs (AACC), while never actually a formal part of the federation, it is an historical descendant of it.  The seed of the idea was carried to the campus of Denison University as early as 1914, during the extension campaign, and was harbored there.  The resultant local Denison Commons Club was assisted by literature of the federation and by the Allegheny College chapter, at the time of its formation in 1916-17, and again in 1920 by the Federation officers, just prior to the completion of a movement at Denison University to organize a union of local Commons Clubs of the Midwest.  Founded  as a "non-fraternity" (but never anti-fraternity) organization, the Denison Commons Club sought to make available to all unaffiliated male students the advantages of fraternity life—which tended to be restricted to an exclusive segment of the campus.  During the fall and winter of 1916, a group consisting of interested men met to develop an organization to provide social advantages to unaffiliated men.  The President of Denison, C.W. Chamberlain, offered his support to the group.  J. Thomas Allison was elected chairman, and those interested in forming an organization signed their names to a list.  J. Leslie Putnam, J.T. Allison, and George B. Cressey were appointed to draw up a constitution.

The ideals for which the chapters strove were Democracy, Brotherhood, University First, Open Door, and non-Greek but not anti-Greek.  Under these ideals, there were no membership restrictions based on race, creed or religion.  All unaffiliated male students in good standing on campus were eligible for membership.  The membership always included a wide variety of racial, national and religious—as well as social and economic—backgrounds.  In line with the "Open Door" policy and the principles of democracy, no more than a 50 percent vote was required to elect a man to membership or qualified Pledges to Active status and entitled them to the ritual.  The right to select members was thus recognized, but it was not carried to the extreme of a "blackball" system.  Unlike most other fraternities, it took a majority vote to deny membership. The "Open Door" swung out as well as in, for a man could leave if he found that he did not fit in with the group or wished to join another fraternity, however, each officer took an oath not to exercise that right during his term of office. The Denison Commons Club strove to give as many men as possible the influence of fraternity life, and looked to what it could do for the man, not what he could do for the Commons Club.  The Denison Commons Club was known for its inclusiveness from its very beginnings.  Many of its members were minorities, biracial or otherwise disenfranchised members of society.

At a convention held in 1921 on April 22 and 23 in Granville, Ohio, delegates from the commons clubs of Denison University, Ohio University, and Hillsdale College met for the express purpose of forming a new national organization. The official delegates who gathered for this purpose were T.V. Caulkins, Jr., and D.S. Cowles of the Denison Commons Club; Dennis West and W.V. Wilkerson of the Ohio University Commons Club; and Clinton Douglas and L.L. Latham of the Hillsdale College Commons Club.  The Ohio Wesleyan group decided not to attend.  The new organization was known official as the American Association of Commons Clubs. The new organization, commonly known as the American Commons Club, was an American letter fraternity for men without restrictions as to race, creed, or color.  The American Association was augmented by a chapter at Wabash College, which was a remnant of a former Federation chapter there.

All chapters active prior to World War II succeeded in resuming operation after the war.  The two in Colorado, however, were lost in 1948 and 1956.  One new chapter was installed in 1949, but after a few years became weak and was asked for its charter in 1961.  Many felt the Commons Club movement lost its relevance and withered in the more liberal climate of student life after World War II. With the withdrawal in 1963 of the Cincinnati Chapter, which had long been active in the Association, the remaining chapters at Denison and Adrian felt it futile to maintain a national organization with just two chapters.  Accordingly, at a Special Convention held at Adrian April 4, 1964, the delegates voted unanimously to suspend national operation as of June 15. By 1964 only the founding chapter at Denison University remained, and in 1969 the American Association of Commons Clubs became an organization of only alumni while the active chapter became a member of Delta Chi national fraternity.  At the time of the suspension of the Association, the national officers then current were designated as a permanent Executive Committee to act in the interests of the Association in all matters regarding protection and use of insignia, maintenance of records, disposition of assets, and other matters.  These officers included the following:  Allan M. Dewey (Denison '37), President;  Edward G. Voss (Denison '50), General Secretary; R.A. Wiley (Adrian '50) Treasurer; and John N. Miller (Denison '54), Editor.  A complete file of Association Convention proceedings, bulletins, handbooks, mimeographed documents, and publications, including The American Commoner, is deposited in the archives of the William Howard Doane Library at Denison.

Association of Commons Clubs
In 1989, a new Commons Club was formed at Indiana University with the support of the alumni of the AACC.  It spread to other Midwestern campuses and continues the Commons Club tradition.

The involvement of women in the Commons Club movement
The Allegheny College Commons Club started in 1903 as the Teutonic Association, an all-male group that included in membership all non-fraternity men.  At its 1909 annual banquet, the idea of adding women to the group resulted in the formation of Teutonia Association “…for the purpose of establishing a closer social relationship and opportunity among all non-sorority women of the college. The Wittenberg University Commons Club began as a group that admitted female students as equal members of the organization.  When the members of DCC first heard of this, The Denison Commoner published the following reflection:
“There is also an organization containing both men and women at Wittenberg which claims to be patterned after the D.C.C.  This is a dream, but, do you suppose that the Commons Club will have female chapters in the future?  The men from Hillsdale ask if there is such a thing, stating that there is need of one at Hillsdale.  Under a separate heading will appear an article telling of the formation of the Shepardson Club, doing the same thing for the women of Shepardson College that the D.C.C. does for the men of Granville College.” Before being admitted as a member of the AACC, the Wittenberg chapter decided to split the group into separate male and female organizations.  It is not known what became of the female group.  At Colorado State University, the AACC chapter helped to form the Valkyries Club for women that continued as a “sister” organization for the life of the chapter. At Denison, the Spring of 1920 saw the organization of the Shepardson Club, a “sister” organization to the Denison Commons Club.  The women of Shepardson College that merged with Denison University at the turn of the century formed the Shepardson Club with the help of the AACC chapter at Denison.  “The idea of the Shepardson Club was conceived in the minds of some freshmen.  Other have seen the need, but realizing the enormity of an undertaking to remedy the situation, have gone no farther.  It remained for those freshman girls to have the initiative and courage to act upon their convictions.  When plans had been formulated, the good will of the sororities assured, and the approval and backing of the faculty and administration obtained, the Shepardson Club was launched.  Unaffilliated upper-classmen and all freshmen were given an opportunity to join and there was an almost universal response…. The primal purpose of the organization is one of service…. Membership will not, however, prevent a girl from leaving at any time to accept a sorority bid.  Through this Club there is now made possible equal social opportunities for all.” The Shepardson Club continued to share participation in many collegiate events over the years with the Denison Chapter.  Eventually, it suffered from the same issues as the Denison Commons Club and ceased operations.  At Ohio University, the local Commons Club attempted to copy Denison in the Spring of 1920 and form a girl’s Commons Club.   
 
Named after the first AACC newsletter, Trianon was another “sister” organization to the Commons Club.  It formed from the mergers of three college clubs in Ohio and Indiana.  First, at the University of Cincinnati, in 1925, Dean Josephine P. Simrall and a group of female students, inspired and encouraged by the Cincinnati Commons Club, created the Campus Club.  Next, in November 1926, several women at Butler University formed a Campus Club on their campus.  Then, in the spring of 1929, thirty-seven female students at Miami University formed the Miami Girl's Club.  Members of the three clubs convened the first National Convention on December 28 and 29, 1929, to form Trianon.  In 1957, Trianon dropped open membership.  The Trianon Pledge Manual explained, "The definition of how a girl could become a candidate was changed from a written application to a girl being invited upon a favorable majority vote of active members."  In 1959, the sorority’s official magazine creased publication.  The sorority was still active in the 1960s, but the last known national convention met in 1965 and by 1974, mention of Trianon’s activities in Butler’s yearbooks ceased.

Commons Club chapters

Notable Commoners

References

Student organizations
Student organizations established in 1833
1833 establishments in Connecticut